Trematocara unimaculatum is a species of cichlid endemic to Lake Tanganyika.  This species can reach a length of  TL.

References

unimaculatum
Fish described in 1901
Taxonomy articles created by Polbot